Bridgehampton is a hamlet and census-designated place (CDP) on the South Fork of Suffolk County, New York, United States. The population was 1,756 at the 2010 census.

Bridgehampton is in the town of Southampton, on Long Island. Shortly after the founding of Southampton in 1640, settlers began to move east to the area known by the Shinnecock Indians as Sagaponack and Mecox. At the head of Sagg Pond, the settlers established a community called Bullhead, later renamed Bridgehampton—after the bridge built across the pond. Sagg Bridge was built in 1686 by Ezekiel Sandford. The bridge was the link between Mecox and Sagaponack and gave this locality its name of Bridgehampton. The notorious criminal and memoirist Stephen Burroughs lived there during the 18th century and helped found the town's first library in 1793; the volumes he purchased could be found in the Bridgehampton Public Library as late as 2002.

Bridgehampton became the home of the horse show known as the Hampton Classic and a road racing course that figured prominently in American automobile racing.

Demographics for the CDP 
As of the census of 2000, there were 1,381 people, 627 households, and 369 families residing in the CDP. The population density was 147.8 per square mile (57.1/km2). There were 1,494 housing units at an average density of 159.9/sq mi (61.8/km2). The racial makeup of the CDP was 78.86% White, 17.38% African American, 0.51% Native American, 0.80% Asian, 1.45% from other races, and 1.01% from two or more races. Hispanic or Latino of any race were 3.26% of the population.

There were 627 households, out of which 19.6% had children under the age of 18 living with them, 47.0% were married couples living together, 7.5% had a female householder with no husband present, and 41.1% were non-families. Of all households 33.0% were made up of individuals, and 12.9% had someone living alone who was 65 years of age or older. The average household size was 2.20 and the average family size was 2.82.

In the CDP, the population was spread out, with 17.7% under the age of 18, 4.1% from 18 to 24, 22.2% from 25 to 44, 33.2% from 45 to 64, and 22.9% who were 65 years of age or older. The median age was 49 years. For every 100 females, there were 95.3 males. For every 100 females age 18 and over, there were 94.0 males.

The median income for a household in the CDP was $54,896, and the median income for a family was $74,583. Males had a median income of $50,865 versus $32,778 for females. The per capita income for the CDP was $43,781. About 6.8% of families and 8.5% of the population were below the poverty line, including 19.2% of those under age 18 and 2.7% of those age 65 or over.

Geography 
Bridgehampton is located at  (40.933182, -72.307987).

Climate
Bridgehampton has a climate transitioning between humid continental, subtropical and maritime. Due to the cold winter lows, plant hardiness more resembles a continental environment in spite of its oceanside location.

Demographics

Education
The Bridgehampton Union Free School District operates one school, the Bridgehampton School, serving grades K through 12. The private Hayground School is also located in the hamlet.

Race circuit 
The historic road racing track has been converted to a golf course and homes.

Notable people
 Lloyd Blankfein, American business executive
 A. J. Pierzynski, American baseball player
 Ernestine Rose born and raised in Bridgehampton, was a librarian at the New York Public Library, and responsible for the purchase and incorporation of the Arthur A. Schomburg collection.
 Carl Yastrzemski, Boston Red Sox, 1967 Triple Crown winner, was born and raised in Bridgehampton

See also
 Bridgehampton Polo Club
 Dia Bridgehampton

References

External links

Bridgehampton Racing Heritage Group

Census-designated places in New York (state)
Census-designated places in Suffolk County, New York
Hamlets in New York (state)
Hamlets in Suffolk County, New York
Populated coastal places in New York (state)
Southampton (town), New York